The Life of a Song is an album by pianist Geri Allen, recorded in 2004 and released on the Telarc label.

The album reunited Allen with drummer Jack DeJohnette and bassist Dave Holland; they had previously performed together on vocalist Betty Carter's live 1993 album, Feed the Fire.

Reception

AllMusic stated: "This is a trio date that has all the elements: an indefatigable lyricism and honesty of emotion, as well as beautiful colors and deft, even uncanny engagements among the three principals. What a welcome return for Allen, who expertly displays she's been refining her chops and listening deeply to her Muse these past six years". The Penguin Guide to Jazz awarded it 4 stars, calling it "a graceful mixture of originals and standards that not only reference past performances but create a shimmering unity of sound that one can readily imagine hovering in the ether long after the record is over".

JazzTimes stated: "Although Geri Allen's versions of standards are marvelously performed, it is her originals that distinguish The Life of a Song. She's writing fresh, distinctive songs that are made even better when performed by a master trio".

Track listing
All compositions by Geri Allen except as indicated
 "LWB's House (The Remix)" - 5:52
 "Mounts and Mountains" - 8:05
 "Lush Life" (Billy Strayhorn) - 8:11
 "In Appreciation: A Celebration Song" - 6:09
 "The Experimental Movement" - 7:09
 "Holdin' Court" - 4:39
 "Dance of the Infidels" (Bud Powell) - 4:03
 "Unconditional Love" - 5:16
 "The Life of a Song" - 5:23
 "Black Bottom" - 4:29
 "Soul Eyes" (Mal Waldron) - 5:40

Personnel 
Geri Allen - piano
Dave Holland - bass 
Jack DeJohnette - drums
Marcus Belgrave - flugelhorn (track 11)
Dwight Andrews - saxophone (track 11)
Clifton Anderson - trombone (track 11)

References 

2004 albums
Geri Allen albums
Telarc Records albums
Instrumental albums